Natalia Krachinnekova (in Stavropol, Russia SSR) is a former individual rhythmic gymnast who competed for the Soviet Union. She is the 1979 World All-around silver medalist.

Career 
Krachinnekova competed in 2 World Championships, she took the all-around bronze medal at the 1973 World Championships behind teammate Galina Shugurova, she won silver in ball, ribbon and clubs in the event finals. She made the Soviet team again in 1977 at the 1977 World Championships in Basel where she won bronze in hoop and ball.

References

External links
 Rhythmic Gymnastics Results

Living people
Russian rhythmic gymnasts
Soviet rhythmic gymnasts
Medalists at the Rhythmic Gymnastics World Championships
Year of birth missing (living people)